Scrophularia californica is a flowering plant in the figwort family which is known by the common names California figwort and California bee plant.

It is native to the western United States, including many habitats in California, and in British Columbia.

Description
Scrophularia californica is an unassuming plant with triangular, toothed, blue-green leaves in pairs opposite each other on a spindly, squared stem.

The brownish-magenta flowers are rounded, hollow buds about a centimeter long with two long upper lobes.

Relationships with animals
This species is a strong bee attractant and also serves as a host plant for variable checkerspot larvae. While bees cannot see the color red, they are nevertheless able to see the flower, likely due to their ability to sense the UV light emitted by the flowers. The checkerspot is able to utilize iridoid glycosides in the sap to make its larva poisonous and adults unpalatable to predators.

Human uses
Native American groups in northern Baja California have used the root of the plant to make a medicinal tea. The Pomo of northwestern California and the Ohlone of the San Francisco Bay Area used it as a poultice for infections and boils.

References

External links
Jepson Manual Treatment: Scrophularia californica
Scrophularia californica — U.C. Photo gallery

californica
Flora of the West Coast of the United States
Flora of California
Flora of British Columbia
Flora of the Sierra Nevada (United States)
Natural history of the California chaparral and woodlands
Natural history of the California Coast Ranges
Natural history of the Peninsular Ranges
Natural history of the Santa Monica Mountains
Natural history of the Transverse Ranges
Taxa named by Adelbert von Chamisso
Flora without expected TNC conservation status